Congolese Jews may refer to:
History of the Jews in the Democratic Republic of the Congo
History of the Jews in the Republic of the Congo